Xylosma glaberrima is a species of flowering plant in the family Salicaceae.

It is endemic to southeast Brazil, in Paraná (state), Rio de Janeiro (state), and São Paulo (state).

It occurs in Restinga and other Atlantic Forest habitats.

References

glaberrima
Endemic flora of Brazil
Flora of the Atlantic Forest
Flora of Paraná (state)
Flora of Rio de Janeiro (state)
Flora of São Paulo (state)
Data deficient plants
Taxonomy articles created by Polbot
Taxa named by Hermann Otto Sleumer